Hyginus Kim Hee-jong was the 5th Archbishop, and current Archbishop Emeritus, of the Gwangju.  Born in Mokpo, South Jeolla Province, Korea in 1947, he was ordained a priest of the Archdiocese of Gwangju in 1975. On 24 June 2003, he was appointed Auxiliary Bishop of the Archdiocese.

On 25 March 2010, he succeeded Archbishop Andreas Choi Chang-mou. He was elected President of the Catholic Bishops' Conference of Korea in 2014.

References

External links
Profile from the Catholic Bishops' Conference of Korea
Profile from Catholic Hierarchy

21st-century Roman Catholic archbishops in South Korea
South Korean Roman Catholic archbishops
Living people
1947 births
People from Mokpo
Roman Catholic archbishops of Gwangju
Roman Catholic bishops of Gwangju